Ground Collision (GCOL), also known as terrain collision refers to the collision that occurs while an aircraft is taxiing to or from its runway. Ground collision could occur when an aircraft collides with another aircraft, structure, building, obstacle, ground vehicle, and person.

Causal factors 

 lack of sufficient training for aviation staff
 lack of sufficient signage and lighting
 lack of space on at various part of the aircraft's pathway especially the manoeuvring area

Instance 

 Air Florida Flight 90: On January 13, 1982, the Boeing 737-222 registered as N62AF crashed into the 14th Street Bridge over the Potomac River. Striking the bridge, which carries Interstate 395 between Washington, DC, and Arlington County, Virginia, it hit seven occupied vehicles and destroyed 97 feet (30 m) of guard rail before plunging through the ice into the Potomac River. Only four passengers and one crew member survived of the 74 passengers and five crew members the flight was carrying.

References 

 
Aviation risks